The 1993–94 Slovak 1.Liga season was the first season of the Slovak 1. Liga, the second level of ice hockey in Slovakia. 10 teams participated in the league, and HK Spartak Dubnica won the championship.

Standings

External links
 Season on hockeyarchives.info

Slovak 1. Liga
Slovak 1. Liga seasons
Slovak 1. Liga